The Peach emoji (🍑) is a fruit emoji featuring a pinkish-orange peach.  Social media users often use it  as a suggestive icon for buttocks during sexting conversations.

Development and usage history
The peach emoji was originally included in proprietary emoji sets from au by KDDI. As part of a set of characters sourced from SoftBank Mobile, au by KDDI, and NTT Docomo emoji sets, the peach emoji was approved as part of Unicode 6.0 in 2010. Global popularity of emojis then surged in the early to mid-2010s. The peach emoji has been included in the Unicode Technical Standard for emoji (UTS #51) since its first edition (Emoji 1.0) in 2015.

Popularity on social media and cultural impact
The peach emoji is commonly used to represent buttocks or even female genitalia in sexting conversations. This usage has been noted to be common in the United States.

The emoji was used as a reference to buttocks including impeachment and the desire to remove the POTUS from office in general on Twitter and other social media. In line with the peach emoji's common usage in sexual contexts, Emojipedia noted that the emoji is popularly paired with the eggplant emoji (🍆), which is often used to represent a penis. During the impeachment proceedings against President Trump in 2019, the peach emoji was used to render "impeachment" as "im🍑ment". The Christian Science Monitor noted that "peach" and "impeachment" are not etymologically related.

Reception
In 2015, Vice claimed that the peach emoji is a "leading contender" for a vulva emoji. In 2021, The Verge stated that peach emoji joined together with new bubbles emoji will be "great", while Cosmopolitan ranked the peach emoji as the 11th "horniest emoji".

In 2016, Apple Inc. brought back the peach emoji and attempted to redesign the emoji to less resemble buttocks; later some fans praised the emoji's comeback, but this was mostly met with fierce backlash in beta testing and Apple reversed its decision by the time it went live to the public. In April 2019, Facebook and Instagram both banned using the eggplant or peach emojis alongside sexual statements about "being horny".

References

Computer-related introductions in 2010
Peaches
Individual emoji
Euphemisms
Symbols introduced in 2010
2010s in Internet culture
2020s in Internet culture